Auxacia is a genus of snout moths. It was described by Émile Louis Ragonot in 1888 and contains the species Auxacia bilineella. It is found in Turkestan, Turkmenistan and Israel.

References

Phycitinae
Monotypic moth genera
Moths of Asia
Taxa named by Émile Louis Ragonot
Pyralidae genera